Chautara Railway Station serves the town of Chautara which lies in Kokrajhar district in the Indian state of Assam.
The station lies on the New Jalpaiguri–New Bongaigaon section of Barauni–Guwahati line of Northeast Frontier Railway. This station falls under Alipurduar railway division.

References

Alipurduar railway division
Railway stations in Assam
Railway stations in Kokrajhar district